Keeri is a village in Nõo Parish, Tartu County in Estonia.

References

Villages in Tartu County